York Regional Council is the political body for the Regional Municipality of York in Ontario, Canada. Created in 1970, it consists of 21 elected representatives plus the Regional Chair. The elected members are the mayors of each of its nine municipalities (Aurora, East Gwillimbury, Georgina, King, Newmarket, Markham, Richmond Hill, Vaughan, and Whitchurch-Stouffville), as well as an additional eleven Regional Councillors from the more populous municipalities—four from Markham, three from Vaughan, two from Richmond Hill and one each from Georgina and Newmarket. These members are elected via double direct election.

The Regional Chair is elected at large by the members of Regional Council at their inaugural meeting and serves a four-year term. The first Regional Chair, Garfield Wright, was appointed by the provincial government upon the creation of York Region and served for two terms (1971-1978). The current Regional Chair is Wayne Emmerson

Regional Council usually meets on the third Thursday of each month at 9:30am at the York Region Administrative Centre offices in Newmarket.

Membership

2022-2026 Regional Council
Elected in the 2022 York Region municipal elections.

The chairman and CEO for this term is Wayne Emmerson.

2018-2022 Regional Council
The chairman and CEO for this term is Wayne Emmerson.

2014-2018 Regional Council
The chairman and CEO of York Regional Council is Wayne Emmerson, who was elected by a majority of York Region Councillors on December 11, 2014.

2010-2014 Regional Council

The chairman and CEO of York Regional Council was Bill Fisch.

Regional Committees

There is no executive committee, instead ideas are brought forward in Regional Committees and voted upon by the council.

 Accessibility Advisory Committee
 Audit Committee
 Community Services and Housing Committee
 Environmental Services Committee
 Finance and Administration Committee
 Planning and Economic Development Committee
 Transportation Services Committee

Boards, Subcommittees and Task Forces
 Canadian National Exhibition (CNE)
 Character Community Foundation of York Region
 Don Watershed Regeneration Council
 Greater Toronto Airports Authority (GTAA)
 Greater Toronto Marketing Alliance
 GTA Agricultural Action Committee
 Housing York Inc
 Human Services Planning Board
 Humber Watershed Alliance
 Lake Simcoe Region Conservation Authority
 Markham Stouffville Hospital
 Rouge Park Alliance Executive
 Royal Agricultural Winter Fair
 Southlake Regional Health Centre
 Toronto and Region Conservation Authority
 York Region Abuse Program
 York Region Community Partnership Council
 York Region Rapid Transit Corporation
 York Regional Police Services Board

Services

Services under the region's scope include:

Children Services
Community Planning
Construction
Corporate Services
Economic Strategy and Tourism
Emergency Medical Services - York Region EMS - downloaded from the Province of Ontario
Environmental
Financial Department
Forestry
Housing
Infrastructure Planning Branch
Legal Services
Long Term Care and Seniors
Public Health and Safety
Real Estate
Planning Services
Regional Property Taxes
York Region Tourism
Transportation Services - regional roads only
Sewers
Employment and Financial Support
Transit - York Region Transit and VIVA
Water - water source via Toronto Water
Waste management (garbage, recycling, hazardous waste; excludes curbside collection)
Policing - York Regional Police

Regional Chairs

The Regional Chair is the CEO of the Region and serves, ex officio, on all Committees. The position replaced the former Warden of York County (1850-1970) and is selected by the other members of Regional Council.

Former Regional Councillors

York Region Administrative Centre

York Regional Council main operations are located at 17250 Yonge Street in Newmarket. The four-floor complex was designed by Canadian architect Douglas Cardinal and opened in 1992. It features an organic building shape with various towers located at the end. The main entrance features two clock towers.

Before 1992, Council sat at 50 Eagle Street, which is now home of the Newmarket Courthouse. The administration offices were located at 62 Bayview Parkway, which was built from 1954 to 1957 for York County and used by the region from 1971 to 1994. The old regional offices are being demolished in 2022.

A new 8 storey glass annex by WZMH Architects has been built to consolidate several rented facilities and also to house the Newmarket Courthouse.

References

External links
 Regional Municipality of York
 Regional Council
 Regional Committees

Politics of the Regional Municipality of York
County and regional councils in Ontario